The Battle of Sông Bé was a major action between the Viet Cong (VC) and Army of the Republic of Vietnam (ARVN) in May 1965.

Planned as a major show of force against the ARVN forces, the VC attempted to capture the fortified capital of Phước Long Province, Sông Bé. Perhaps to their surprise, ARVN forces in the area rallied and re-took the town by the end of the second day of combat. Several additional days of chasing the VC forces involved proved fruitless, as they escaped.

Background
A series of political and military setbacks starting as early as 1962 had been gradually eroding the combat effectiveness of the ARVN forces, originally more than a match for the VC with their United States supplied helicopters and armored personnel carriers. The VC forces had been left to train in relative safety and had developed new tactics and been supplied with new weapons that upset the balance of power. By 1964 ARVN morale was collapsing and the VC was in nominal control of much of the countryside. To capitalize on this, the VC was planning ever-larger operations.

On April 16, 1965, the U.S. Special Forces SF B-34 Detachment was sent to Sông Bé to reinforce the ARVN forces, joining an existing MACV team headquarters in the town. They set about building up a fortified area on a nearby hill and were joined by the POW intelligence team, 120 ARVN, and several light tanks manned by local militiamen.

Battle
At 01:45 on May 10, the VC 761st and 763rd Regiments consisting of 2,500 infantry attacked the city from multiple directions, first using mortar barrages and then rushing in their forces. Even though the American positions were still being constructed, the special forces and ARVN were able to stop them from overrunning their positions and the area of the town around them. Hung up on the defenses, many of the VC became easy targets for U.S. snipers. At 03:45 helicopter gunships arrived but were unable to see the ground because of fog and low clouds. They instead attacked supporting artillery (likely 82mm mortars) west of the town. Attempts to evacuate casualties by helicopter were repeatedly driven off by 50-caliber machine guns, until these were suppressed by F-4 Phantoms using cluster munitions. The machine guns silenced, the evacuation finally took place at 08:00.

Even though the base had been defended, much of the town had fallen to VC control. They positioned machine gun and flamethrower units at almost every street corner. At noon, the 36th ARVN Ranger Battalion brazenly attacked into the town, and drove off the VC occupying the center of the town, often resorting to melee combat using knives and swords. They were joined a few hours later by the 34th ARVN Rangers, and by evening the entire town was returned to South Vietnamese control.

Notes

References
 Bowman S.John(1989)The Vietnam War: Day by Day. Bison Group, London.
 Battle of Sông Bé

Contemporary news reporting

Conflicts in 1965
1965 in Vietnam
Battles involving Vietnam
Battles and operations of the Vietnam War
Battles involving the United States
Battle
May 1965 events in Asia